Leyla Vladimirovna Adamyan (: born January 20, 1949, Tbilisi) is  a Soviet and Russia  an obstetrician-gynecologist, the doctor of medical sciences, teacher, professor.

Biography
Head of the Department of Operative Gynecology Kulakov Research Center of Obstetrics, Gynecology and perinatologiia. Chief obstetrician-gynecologist of the Russian Federation.

Academician of the Academy of Medical Sciences (2004; Corresponding Member of 1999). Academician of the Russian Academy of Sciences (2013).

Awards and honors
 Honored Worker of Science (2002).
 Winner of Russian Government Prize (2001).
 Awarded Order "For Merit to the Fatherland"  2nd (2018),  3rd  (2014) and 4th class (2009)

References

External links
 Лейла Вагоевна Адамян 
 Leyla Vladimirovna Adamyan

1949 births
Living people
Physicians from Tbilisi
Armenian obstetricians
Soviet obstetricians and gynaecologists
Russian obstetricians
Russian gynaecologists
Recipients of the Order "For Merit to the Fatherland", 2nd class
Recipients of the Order "For Merit to the Fatherland", 3rd class
Recipients of the Order "For Merit to the Fatherland", 4th class
Honoured Scientists of the Russian Federation
Russian women scientists
Full Members of the Russian Academy of Sciences
Armenian expatriates in Russia
Georgian people of Armenian descent
Russian people of Armenian descent
Armenian women physicians
20th-century Russian physicians
21st-century Russian physicians
Armenian gynaecologists
20th-century women physicians
21st-century women physicians